Anthony L. Bland (born December 12, 1972) is a former American football wide receiver who played for the Minnesota Vikings of the National Football League (NFL). He played college football at Florida A&M University.

References 

1972 births
Living people
American football wide receivers
Florida A&M Rattlers football players
Minnesota Vikings players